Proxymity is a digital investor communications platform that streamlines processes such as proxy voting and shareholder disclosure. It was developed and operated by Citigroup Inc in London before it spun out in 2020 to become its own company.

History 
Two Citi employees formulated the idea and started working on Proxymity as a digital proxy voting solution in 2017, and the concept was nurtured through Citi's D10X innovation program. In November of the same year, four key institutional investors Aviva Investors, Legal & General Investment Management, Aberdeen Standard Investments and Robeco agreed to pilot the platform at four AGMs including one meeting from a FTSE 100 company. In March 2018, Proxymity won the Global Custodian's award for Innovation in Securities Services Technology and would launch in the UK Market in that year and Australia the following year. Between 2019 and February 2020, Proxymity was used in 561 Australian companies' AGMs, and a total of 3,000 shareholder meetings in Europe and Australia by May 2020. In May 2020, Citigroup announced that it raised $20.5 million from eight investors including The Bank of New York Mellon, Citigroup, Clearstream, Computershare, Deutsche Bank AG, HSBC Holdings Plc, JPMorgan Chase, and State Street Corp. and that Proxymity became its own entity after raising the funds. Proxymity has launched its services fully in The UK and Australia, and has completed pilots in Germany, The Netherlands, Belgium, Austria and Spain.

In May 2020, Citigroup has formally spun off the Proxymity shareholder services business into a stand-alone firm.

Description 
Proxymity's core algorithm simplifies the flow of information by linking issuers, intermediaries and investors digitally. Through Proxymity, shareholders are instantly notified once a meeting has been announced, benefit from market deadlines for voting which can give an additional nine days research and vote, and real time confirmation that their votes were received and recorded in the meetings.

References

External links 
 

British companies established in 2017
Software companies established in 2017
Software companies of the United Kingdom
Software companies based in London